Smith Red Valencia is a pigmented bud sport of a conventional Valencia orange tree.

An initial scientific report stated:

Although red inside, the Smith Red is a Valencia and not a blood orange. Researchers were made aware of it in 1988 when a woman named Merleen Smith in Ventura County, California contacted a local farm advisor on the suspicion that her neighbor was poisoning her tree; the cultivar now bears her name.

References 

Orange cultivars